Enrique Alberto Bologna Gómez (born 13 February 1982 in Claypole, Buenos Aires), known as Enrique Bologna, is an Argentine professional footballer who plays for Banfield.

Career
Bologna began playing for Banfield in 2003, he spent 2008 on loan to Peruvian side Alianza Lima. He returned to Banfield in 2008 and was a non playing member of the squad that won the Apertura 2009 championship.

Honours
Banfield
Argentine Primera División: Apertura 2009
 Primera B Nacional: 2013–14

Peñarol
Uruguayan Primera División: 2012–13

River Plate
Recopa Sudamericana: 2016
Copa Argentina: 2015–16
Supercopa Argentina: 2017
Copa Libertadores: 2018

See also
List of goalscoring goalkeepers

Notes

External links
  
 
 
 

1982 births
Living people
Argentine footballers
Argentine expatriate footballers
Association football goalkeepers
Sportspeople from Buenos Aires Province
Argentine people of Italian descent
Club Alianza Lima footballers
Club Atlético Banfield footballers
Club de Gimnasia y Esgrima La Plata footballers
Club Atlético River Plate footballers
Peñarol players
Argentine Primera División players
Primera Nacional players
Uruguayan Primera División players
Peruvian Primera División players
Argentine expatriate sportspeople in Peru
Argentine expatriate sportspeople in Uruguay
Expatriate footballers in Peru
Expatriate footballers in Uruguay